Vishnu Raj Menon is an Indian model and a beauty pageant titleholder who won Mr. India 2016.

Early life and career

Vishnu was born on 10 June 1991 in Pattikkad, Thrissur, Kerala, India. His father, Surendran is a retired PWD engineer, while his mother, Padmavati, is an assistant bank manager. He did his schooling from Don Bosco School, Mannuthy in Kerala and shifted to Bangalore for further studies. He is a civil engineer and a model by profession. He has graduated from MVJ College of Engineering, Bangalore.
He was crowned Mister India by the outgoing titleholder Rohit Khandelwal 
on 11 December 2016 in Mumbai.
Vishnu represented India at the Mister World pageant held on August 23, 2019 in Manila, Philippines.

References

External links
 

Living people
Indian male models
Indian beauty pageant winners
Beauty pageant contestants from India
1991 births